The Turzak House is a house located at 7059 North Olcott Avenue in Chicago, Illinois, United States. The house was built between 1938 and 1939 by Bruce Goff for Charles Turzak. It was designated a Chicago Landmark on December 9, 1992.

References

Houses in Chicago
Houses completed in 1939
Chicago Landmarks
Bruce Goff buildings